This is a list of Iranian football transfers for the 2022 summer transfer window. Only moves from Persian Gulf Pro League are listed.
The summer transfer window will begin on 13 June 2022 and closes at midnight on 31 August 2022.
Players without a club may join at any time. This list includes transfers featuring at least one Iran Football League club which were completed after the end of the winter 2021–22 transfer window on 12 February 2022 and before the end of the 2022 summer window.

Rules and regulations 
According to Iran Football Federation rules for 2022–23 Persian Gulf Pro League, each Football Club is allowed to take up to maximum 7 new Iranian player from the other clubs who already played in the 2021–22 Persian Gulf Pro League season. In addition to these seven new players, each club is allowed to take up to 3 players from Free agent (who did not play in 2022–23 Persian Gulf Pro League season or doesn't list in any 2022–23 League after season's start) during the season. Under-25 years old players must be under contract of the club in the previous season. Under-21 and under-19 years old players can also be signed during the season.

Players limits
The Iranian Football Clubs who participate in 22–23 Iranian football different levels are allowed to have up to maximum 63 players in their player lists, which will be categorized in the following groups:
 Up to maximum 20 adult (without any age limit) players
 Up to maximum 4 under-25 players (i.e. the player whose birth is after 1 January 1998).
 Up to maximum 9 under-23 players (i.e. the player whose birth is after 1 January 2000).
 Up to maximum 15 under-21 players (i.e. the player whose birth is after 1 January 2002).
 Up to maximum 15 under-19 players (i.e. the player whose birth is after 1 January 2004).

Persian Gulf Pro League

Aluminium

In:

Out:

Esteghlal

In:

Out:

Foolad

In:

 

Out:

Gol Gohar

In:

Out:

Havadar

In:

 

Out:

Malavan

In:

Out:

Mes Kerman

In:

Out:

Mes Rafsanjan

In:

Out:

Naft Masjed-Soleyman

In:

Out:

Nassaji

In:

Out:

Paykan

In:

Out:

Persepolis

In:

Out:

Sanat Naft

In:

Out:

Sepahan

In:

Out:

Tractor

In:

Out:

Zob Ahan

In:

Out:

Notes and references

Football transfers summer 2022
2022-23
Transfers